A number of icebreakers have been named Eisbär, German for "polar bear":

 Eisbär, a 1942-built icebreaker hander over to the Soviet Union as war reparations in 1946
 Eisbär, an Eisvogel-class icebreaker built in 1969 and decommissioned in 1997